The Metropolitan Opera House, also known as the Old Metropolitan Opera House and Old Met, was an opera house located at 1411 Broadway in  Manhattan, New York City. Opened in 1883 and demolished in 1967, it was the first home of the Metropolitan Opera.

History

The Metropolitan Opera Company was founded in 1883. The Metropolitan Opera House, opened on October 22, 1883, with a performance of Faust. It was located at 1411 Broadway, occupying the whole block between West 39th Street and West 40th Street on the west side of the street in the Garment District of Midtown Manhattan. Nicknamed "The Yellow Brick Brewery" for its industrial looking exterior, the original Metropolitan Opera House was designed by J. Cleaveland Cady. Critical reception of the original Metropolitan Opera House was largely negative; one source called it "Disappointing . . . flat, forceless and ineffective".

On August 27, 1892, the theater was gutted by fire. The 1892−93 season was canceled while the opera house was rebuilt along its original lines. The Vaudeville Club (which eventually became the Metropolitan Opera Club) was founded that season, hosting entertainment in the undamaged portions of the house.

Enlargements
In 1903, architects Carrère and Hastings extensively redesigned the interior of the opera house. The golden auditorium with its sunburst chandelier, and curved proscenium inscribed with the names of six composers (Gluck, Mozart, Beethoven, Wagner, Gounod and Verdi), dated from this time. The first of the Met's signature gold damask stage curtains was installed in 1906, completing the look that the Old Metropolitan Opera House maintained until its closing.

In 1940, ownership of the opera house shifted from the wealthy families who occupied the theater's boxes to the non-profit Metropolitan Opera Association. At this time the last major change to the auditorium's interior was completed. The second tier of privately held boxes (the "grand tier") was converted into standard row seating. This enlarged the seating capacity and left only the first tier of boxes from the "golden horseshoe" of the opera house's origins as a showplace for New York society.

The Met had a seating capacity of 3,625 with 224 standing room places.

Decline
While the theater was praised for its acoustics and interior, as early as the 1900s the backstage facilities were deemed to be severely inadequate for a large opera company. Scenery and sets were a regular sight leaning against the building exterior on 39th Street where crews had to shift them between performances. Various plans were put forward over the years to build a new home for the company and designs for new opera houses were created by various architects including Joseph Urban. Proposed new locations included Columbus Circle and what is now Rockefeller Center, but none of these plans came to fruition. Only with the development of Lincoln Center on New York's Upper West Side did the Met finally have the opportunity to build a modern opera house.

The New York City Landmarks Preservation Commission considered designating the Old Met as a city landmark in 1966; if the building had been protected as a landmark, it would have been one of the first such designations in the city. The Metropolitan Opera left its old house on April 16, 1966, with a sentimental gala farewell performance featuring nearly all of the company's current leading artists. Despite a plea from conductor Leopold Stokowski, the Met opposed the preservation of its old house; New York state senator John J. Marchi introduced legislation to preserve the opera house, but he was unsuccessful. The final performance at the opera house was given by the Bolshoi Ballet, which concluded a short run of appearances on May 8, 1966, and the Met moved to the new Metropolitan Opera House at Lincoln Center that September. The theater was purchased by Jack D. Weiler The Old Met was razed in 1967 and was replaced by a 40-story office tower, 1411 Broadway, designed by Irwin S. Chanin.

References
Notes

Bibliography
Mayer, Martin. The Met: One Hundred Years of Grand Opera. 1983. Thames and Hudson. London.

External links

Metropolitan Opera House interior photo 1966 Life magazine

1883 establishments in New York (state)
1966 disestablishments in New York (state)
Broadway (Manhattan)
Buildings and structures demolished in 1967
Carrère and Hastings buildings
Demolished buildings and structures in Manhattan
Former music venues in New York City
Metropolitan Opera
Midtown Manhattan
Music venues completed in 1883
Opera houses in New York City
Theatres completed in 1883